Geophilus algarum is a species of centipede in the family Geophilidae found in the littoral zone on the French Atlantic and Channel Coasts. It has one subspecies, G. algarum var. decipiens, which can be identified by lack of a dorsal coxal pore. The male of this species has 53 pairs of legs; females have 53 to 59.

Taxonomy
G. algarum shares several characteristics with both G. fucorum and G. gracilis, leading some to believe that the three are a single polytypic species consisting of highly individual subspecies. It's differentiated from the two by having two labral teeth, a clear clypeal area, 8-12 prehensorial teeth, three ventral (posterior) and one dorsal coxal pore, and a well-developed claw of the anal leg.

References 

algarum
Animals described in 1909